The  was a fleet of the Imperial Japanese Navy (IJN) created as a mobile strike force in response to hostilities with Russia, and saw action in every IJN military operation until the end of World War II.

History
Established on 27 October 1903, the 2nd Fleet was created by the Imperial General Headquarters as a mobile strike force of cruisers and destroyers to pursue the Imperial Russian Navy's Vladivostok-based cruiser squadron while the remaining bulk of the Japanese fleet (the IJN 1st Fleet) continued to blockade Port Arthur in hopes of luring the battleships of the Russian Pacific Fleet into an open sea classic line of battle confrontation.

As the main mobile force in the IJN, the 2nd Fleet saw the bulk of all future IJN combat operations from the time of its inception until IJN dissolution at the end of World War II.

Order of Battle at time of Pearl Harbor
Based at Samah, Hainan Island

4th Division
CA Takao (fleet flagship)
CA Atago
CA Chōkai
CA Maya

5th Division
CA Haguro (flagship)
CA Myōkō
CA Nachi

7th Division
CA Kumano (flagship)
CA Mikuma
CA Mogami
CA Suzuya

8th Division
CA Tone (flagship)
CA Chikuma

Other
AD Kamikaze Maru

2nd Destroyer Squadron
CL Jintsū (flagship)

8th Destroyer Division
DD Arashio
DD Asashio
DD Michishio
DD Ōshio

15th Destroyer Division
DD Hayashio
DD Kuroshio
DD Natsushio
DD Oyashio

16th Destroyer Division
DD Amatsukaze
DD Hatsukaze
DD Tokitsukaze
DD Yukikaze

18th Destroyer Division
DD Arare
DD Kagerō
DD Kasumi
DD Shiranuhi

4th Destroyer Squadron
CL Naka (flagship)

2nd Destroyer Division
DD Harusame
DD Murasame
DD Samidare
DD Yudachi

4th Destroyer Division
DD Arashi
DD Hagikaze
DD Maikaze
DD Nowaki

9th Destroyer Division
DD Asagumo
DD Minegumo
DD Natsugumo
DD Yamagumo

24th Destroyer Division
DD Kawakaze
DD Suzukaze
DD Umikaze
DD Yamakaze

Order in the Malayan Campaign

Distant Cover Force

Closed Cover Force

Invasion Force

Commanders of the IJN 2nd Fleet

References

Books

External links

Notes

2
Military units and formations established in 1903
Military units and formations disestablished in 1945
1945 disestablishments in Japan